Aneura pinguis is a species of liverworts belonging to the family Aneuraceae. It has a cosmopolitan distribution.

References

Metzgeriales